Wusab As Safil District is a district of the Dhamar Governorate, Yemen. As of 2003, the district had a population of 149,531 inhabitants. It is part of the historical and geographical region of Wusab.

References

Districts of Dhamar Governorate